Paramaenas is a genus of moths in the family Erebidae from the Afrotropics. The genus was erected by Karl Grünberg in 1911.

Species
 Paramaenas affinis (Rothschild, 1933)
 Paramaenas nephelistis (Hampson, 1907)
 Paramaenas nephelistis diaphana (Rothschild, 1933)
 Paramaenas nephelistis hecate (Fawcett, 1916)
 Paramaenas strigosus Grünberg, 1911

References

Spilosomina
Moth genera